The 1957–58 Temple Owls men's basketball team represented Temple University during the 1957–58 NCAA University Division men's basketball season. The team was led by head coach Harry Litwack and played their home games at The Palestra in Philadelphia, Pennsylvania. Playing out of the East region, the Owls made a run to the Final Four of the NCAA tournament. In the National semifinals, Temple lost to eventual champion Kentucky, 61–60. The Owls bounced back to defeat Kansas State in the consolation game to finish with a record of 27–3. It was the second time in three seasons Temple reached the Final Four and took third place.

Roster

Schedule and results

|-
!colspan=9 style=| Regular season

|-
!colspan=9 style=| NCAA Tournament

Rankings

Awards and honors
 Guy Rodgers – Consensus First-team All-American

Team players drafted into the NBA

References

Temple Owls men's basketball seasons
Temple Owls
NCAA Division I men's basketball tournament Final Four seasons
Temple
Temple
Temple